Centrist reformism is a South Korean political ideology. It is part of South Korea's centrist tradition.

History 
The first party to put "Jungdogaehyeok" as the main ideology of the party was the conservative-liberal Peace Democratic Party and  led by Kim Dae-jung in 1987. But when the National Congress for New Politics was founded in 1995, it emphasized: "moderate conservatives" more than "Jungdogaehyeok" to gain more support from conservatives. However, since the left-liberal Roh Moo-hyun government, the term has not been used frequently for some time.

In 2016, People Party officially put forward "Jungdogaehyeok" as its main ideology.

Jungdogaehyeok parties 
 Peace Democratic Party (1987–1991)
 Democratic Party (1991–1995)
 National Congress for New Politics (1995–2000)
 Democratic Party (2000–2007)
 Creative Korea Party (2007–2012)
 Democratic Party (2007–2008)
 People Party (2016–2018)
 Bareunmirae Party (2018–2020)
 Party for Democracy and Peace (2018–2020)
 New Alternatives (2019–2020)
 People Party (2020–2022)
 Minsaeng Party (since 2020)

See also 
 Liberalism in South Korea
 Radical centrism
 Reformism

External links
 Namuwiki — Centrist reformism

References 

Centre-right politics
Centrism in Asia
Conservative liberalism
Kim Dae-jung
Liberalism in South Korea